The Los Angeles Cobras were a professional arena football team based in Los Angeles, California that played one season (1988) in the Arena Football League.

History

On March 16, 1988, it was announced that team would be nicknamed the Cobras, as well as the introduction of head coach Ray Willsey. The Cobras played their home games at the Los Angeles Sports Arena, which they shared with the Los Angeles Clippers of the National Basketball Association. The team's logo consisted of an interlocking "LA" in which the left upright of the "A" was formed by the hooded head and "neck" of a cobra.

The team debuted April 30, 1988 against the New York Knights. The Cobras started the season 0–3, but finished the season 5–3–1, clinching a playoff spot.

Despite a lineup that featured former NFL all-pro receiver Cliff Branch, ex-UCLA quarterback Matt Stevens and future Arena Football Hall of Famer Gary Mullen, Los Angeles drew dismal crowds: just 7,507 per game, second-worst in the AFL. The Cobras lost in the semifinals to the Chicago Bruisers, 29–16. It turned out to be their last game ever as the Cobras  folded after the 1988 season, temporarily cutting the league down

Season-by-season

|-
|1988 || 5 || 6|| 1 || 4th || Lost Week 1 (Chicago 29-16)
|-
!Totals || 5 || 7 || 1
|colspan="2"| (including playoffs)
|}

Notable players

Roster

Arena Football League Hall of Famers

All-Arena players
The following Cobras players were named to All-Arena Teams:
QB Matt Stevens
WR/DB Gary Mullen

Notable coaches

Head coaches

Staff
Head coach: Ray Willsey
Assistant coach: Lew Erber
Running back & special teams coach: Russ Steele
Football operations coordinator: Larry Westbrook
Trainer: Nick Ortenzo
Equipment manager: Marty Hopkins

Media
The Cobras are also featured in the film Kinjite: Forbidden Subjects starring Charles Bronson. One scene takes place during a Cobras/Bruisers game, presumably the final regular season contest played July 14, 1988 (this game also had the distinction of ending 37-37, making it the first tie game in arena football history). The film was released in early 1989.
The Cobras were also featured as an unlockable team in EA Sports' Arena Football.

References

External links
 L.A. Cobras at ArenaFan.com

Defunct Arena Football League teams
American football teams established in 1988
Sports clubs disestablished in 1988
1988 establishments in California
1988 disestablishments in California
Cobras
Cobras
Defunct American football teams in California